Manderscheid is a former Verbandsgemeinde ("collective municipality") in the district Bernkastel-Wittlich, in Rhineland-Palatinate, Germany. Its seat of administration was in Manderscheid. On 1 July 2014 it merged into the Verbandsgemeinde Wittlich-Land.

The Verbandsgemeinde Manderscheid consisted of the following Ortsgemeinden ("local municipalities"):

Former Verbandsgemeinden in Rhineland-Palatinate